Myriam J. A. Chancy (born 1970) is a Haitian-Canadian-American writer and a fellow of the John Simon Guggenheim Memorial Foundation. , she is the Hartley Burr Alexander Chair of Humanities at Scripps College of the Claremont Consortium. As a writer, she focuses on Haitian culture, gender, class, sexuality, and Caribbean women's studies. Her novels have won several awards, including the Guyana Prize in Literature Caribbean Award.

Early life 
Chancy was born and raised in Port-au-Prince, Haiti before relocating during childhood to Quebec City, and then to Winnipeg, Canada. She attended the University of Manitoba in Manitoba, Canada, where she received a Bachelor of Arts degree in English and Philosophy with Honors. Following that, she received her master's degree in English literature from Dalhousie University in Nova Scotia, Canada, where she wrote her thesis on "James Baldwin and the Dissolution of the Color Line." She received her Ph.D. in English at the University of Iowa in 1994.

Career 
Chancy has held several positions in academia over the course of her lifetime. She has taught English and Women's Studies at Vanderbilt University, at Arizona State University, and at Louisiana State University. Additionally, she has held visiting professorships at both Smith College and the University of California, Santa Barbara. She formerly taught courses in African Diaspora Studies, Caribbean Literature, Postcolonial Literature and Theory, Feminist Theory, Women's Studies, and creative writing (Fiction), at the University of Cincinnati as a Professor of English & Africana Studies. From 2002 until 2004, she served as the Editor-in-Chief of the  academic arts journal Meridians: feminism, race, transnationalism, receiving the Phoenix Award for Editorial Achievement from the Council of Editors of Learned Journals. Chancy served on the editorial advisory board for the Journal of the Modern Language Association from 2010-2012 and on the Advisory Council in the Humanities of the Fetzer Institute from 2011-2013.

Spirit of Haiti, her first novel, was a Commonwealth Prize Finalist. It was followed by The Scorpion's Claw. Chancy's third novel, The Loneliness of Angels was the 2011 recipient of the Guyana Prize in Literature Caribbean Award for Best Fiction. Her academic work Searching for Safe Spaces: Afro-Caribbean Women Writers in Exile (1997) served as one of the first books to address exile as a defining aspect of Afro-Caribbean women's experiences. Her second 1997 book, Framing Silence, was the first book-length study devoted to Haitian women's literature as a field of analysis. Framing Silence examined six writers: Mme. Virgil Valcin, Annie Desroy, Nadine Magloire, Marie Chauvet, Jan J. Dominique, Anne-christine d'Adesky and Edwidge Danticat.  Chancy was granted early tenure on the basis of these two books. She published From Sugar to Revolution: Women's Visions of Haiti, Cuba and the Dominican Republic in 2012 and received the prestigious Guggenheim Fellowship for Literary Criticism in 2014. In 2021, her novel on the 2010 Haiti earthquake, What Storm, What Thunder by Harper Collins Canada and Tin House was published. It was shortlisted for the Caliba Golden Poppy Award, and the Aspen Words Literary Prize.

Literary works 
 Searching for Safe Spaces: Afro-Caribbean Women Writers in Exile (Temple University Press, 1997)
 Framing Silence: Revolutionary Novels by Haitian Women (Rutgers University Press, 1997)
 Spirit of Haiti (London: Mango Publications, 2003)
 The Scorpion's Claw (Peepal Tree Press, 2005)
 The Loneliness of Angels (Peepal Tree Press, 2010)
 From Sugar to Revolution: Women's Visions of Haiti, Cuba and the Dominican Republic (Wilfrid Laurier UP, 2012)
 What Storm, What Thunder (Harper Collins Canada, 2021)

Awards 
1998 - Outstanding Academic Book Award by Choice for Searching for Safe Spaces
2004 - Phoenix Award for Editorial Achievement from the Council of Editors of Learned Journals
2011 - Guyana Prize in Literature Caribbean Award (Best Fiction) for The Loneliness of Angels
2014 - John S. Guggenheim Fellowship

References

External links
 Official website

1970 births
Living people
People from Port-au-Prince
Haitian emigrants to Canada
Haitian Quebecers
Canadian women poets
University of Cincinnati faculty
University of Manitoba alumni
Dalhousie University alumni
University of Iowa alumni
Vanderbilt University faculty
Arizona State University faculty
Louisiana State University faculty
20th-century Canadian women writers
21st-century Canadian women writers
Black Canadian writers
20th-century Canadian poets
21st-century Canadian poets
Writers from Winnipeg
Black Canadian women
21st-century Canadian novelists
Canadian women novelists